Zodarion is a genus of ant-eating spiders from the family Zodariidae. 169 species from Eurasia, North Africa and North America have been described .

Species
, the World Spider Catalog accepted the following species:

Zodarion abantense Wunderlich, 1980 – Turkey, Georgia, Russia
Zodarion abnorme Denis, 1952 – Morocco
Zodarion aculeatum Chyzer, 1897 – Bulgaria, Romania, Serbia, Macedonia
Zodarion aerium Simon, 1890 – Yemen
Zodarion affine (Simon, 1870) – Spain
Zodarion agricola Bouseksou & Abrous, 2021 – Algeria
Zodarion alacre (Simon, 1870) – Portugal, Spain
Zodarion albipatellare Bosmans, 2009 – Crete
Zodarion alentejanum Pekár & Carvalho, 2011 – Portugal
Zodarion algarvense Bosmans, 1994 – Portugal
Zodarion algiricum (Lucas, 1846) – Algeria
Zodarion andalusiacum Jocqué, 1991 – Portugal, Spain
Zodarion arabelae Bosmans, 2009 – Greece
Zodarion arachnaio Bosmans, 2009 – Greece
Zodarion atlanticum Pekár & Cardoso, 2005 – Portugal, Azores
Zodarion atriceps (O. Pickard-Cambridge, 1872) – Lebanon
Zodarion attikaense Wunderlich, 1980 – Greece
Zodarion aurorae Weiss, 1982 – Romania
Zodarion azrouense Bosmans & Benhalima, 2020 – Morocco
Zodarion bacelarae Pekár, 2003 – Portugal
Zodarion barbarae Bosmans, 2009 – Greece
Zodarion beroni Komnenov & Chatzaki, 2016 – Greece
Zodarion berryi Bosmans & Draney, 2018 – USA
Zodarion beticum Denis, 1957 – Spain
Zodarion bicoloripes (Denis, 1959) – Algeria
Zodarion bigaense Bosmans, Özkütük, Varli & Kunt, 2014 – Turkey
Zodarion blagoevi Bosmans, 2009 – Bulgaria, Greece
Zodarion bosmansi Pekár & Cardoso, 2005 – Portugal
Zodarion bozdagensis Coşar, 2021 – Turkey
Zodarion buettikeri (Ono & Jocqué, 1986) – Saudi Arabia, Iran
Zodarion caporiaccoi Roewer, 1942 – Italy
Zodarion caucasicum Dunin & Nenilin, 1987 – Azerbaijan
Zodarion cesari Pekár, 2011 – Spain, France (Corsica)
Zodarion christae Bosmans, 2009 – Greece, Turkey
Zodarion confusum Denis, 1935 – Italy, Turkey
Zodarion costablancae Bosmans, 1994 – Portugal, Spain
Zodarion costapratae Pekár, 2011 – Portugal
Zodarion couseransense Bosmans, 1997 – France
Zodarion crewsae (Coşar, Danışman & Kunt, 2022) – Turkey
Zodarion cyrenaicum Denis, 1935 – Libya, Egypt, Israel
Zodarion danismani Coşar, 2021 – Turkey
Zodarion deccanensis (Tikader & Malhotra, 1976) – India
Zodarion deltshevi Bosmans, 2009 – Turkey
Zodarion diatretum Denis, 1935 – Spain
Zodarion dispar Denis, 1935 – Algeria
Zodarion duriense Cardoso, 2003 – Portugal
Zodarion egens Denis, 1937 – Unknown
Zodarion elegans (Simon, 1873) – Southern Europe, North Africa
Zodarion emarginatum (Simon, 1873) – France, Corsica, Malta, Greece
Zodarion emilijae (Deltshev & Naumova, 2022) – North Macedonia
Zodarion epirense Brignoli, 1984 – Bulgaria, Greece
Zodarion ericorum Bosmans, 2020 – Morocco
Zodarion evvoia Bosmans, 2009 – Greece
Zodarion expers (O. Pickard-Cambridge, 1876) – Egypt, Israel
Zodarion fazanicum Denis, 1938 – Libya
Zodarion frenatum Simon, 1885 – Italy, Bulgaria, Greece, Crete, Corfu, Turkey
Zodarion fulvonigrum (Simon, 1874) – France
Zodarion fuscum (Simon, 1870) – Britain, France, Spain, Portugal
Zodarion gallicum (Simon, 1873) – France, Corsica, Italy, Balkans, Turkey
Zodarion gaziantepense Danışman & Coşar, 2021 – Turkey
Zodarion germanicum (C. L. Koch, 1837) – Europe
Zodarion geshur Levy, 2007 – Israel
Zodarion gracilitibiale Denis, 1934 – France, Italy
Zodarion graecum (C. L. Koch, 1843) – Eastern Europe, Lebanon, Israel
Zodarion granulatum Kulczyński, 1908 – Cyprus, Greece, Turkey, Lebanon, Israel
Zodarion gregua Bosmans, 1994 – Portugal, Spain
Zodarion guadianense Cardoso, 2003 – Portugal
Zodarion hamatum Wiehle, 1964 – Italy, Austria, Slovenia
Zodarion hauseri Brignoli, 1984 – North Macedonia, Bulgaria, Greece
Zodarion immaculatum Denis, 1962 – Libya
Zodarion imroz Dimitrov, 2020 – Bulgaria, Turkey
Zodarion inderensis (Ponomarev, 2007) – Kazakhstan
Zodarion isabellinum (Simon, 1870) – Spain, Morocco
Zodarion italicum (Canestrini, 1868) – Europe
Zodarion izmirense Danışman & Coşar, 2020 – Turkey
Zodarion jansseni Bosmans, 2009 – Greece
Zodarion jeanclaudeledouxi Bosmans & Benhalima, 2020 – Morocco
Zodarion jozefienae Bosmans, 1994 – Portugal, Spain
Zodarion judaeorum Levy, 1992 – Israel
Zodarion kabylianum Denis, 1937 – Algeria
Zodarion karpathos Bosmans, 2009 – Greece
Zodarion killini Bosmans, 2009 – Greece
Zodarion konradi Bosmans, 2009 – Greece
Zodarion korgei Wunderlich, 1980 – Turkey
Zodarion kossamos Bosmans, 2009 – Greece
Zodarion kunti Coşar, Danışman & Yağmur, 2021 – Turkey
Zodarion luctuosum (O. Pickard-Cambridge, 1872) – Israel
Zodarion ludibundum Simon, 1914 – Corsica, Sicily, Algeria
Zodarion lusitanicum Cardoso, 2003 – Portugal, Spain
Zodarion lutipes (O. Pickard-Cambridge, 1872) – Cyprus, Israel, Lebanon, Jordan
Zodarion machadoi Denis, 1939 – Portugal, Spain, Azores
Zodarion maculatum (Simon, 1870) – Portugal, Spain, France, Sicily, Morocco
Zodarion maghrebense Bosmans & Benhalima, 2020 – Morocco, Algeria
Zodarion mallorca Bosmans, 1994 – Mallorca
Zodarion marginiceps Simon, 1914 – Spain, France
Zodarion merlijni Bosmans, 1994 – Portugal, Spain
Zodarion mesranense Bouragba & Bosmans, 2012 – Algeria
Zodarion messiniense Bosmans, 2009 – Greece
Zodarion minutum Bosmans, 1994 – Spain, Mallorca, Ibiza
Zodarion modestum (Simon, 1870) – Spain
Zodarion montesacrense Bosmans, 2019 – Italy
Zodarion morosoides Bosmans, 2009 – Greece
Zodarion morosum Denis, 1935 – Macedonia, Bulgaria, Albania, Greece, Turkey, Ukraine, Russia
Zodarion mostafai Benhalima & Bosmans, 2020 – Morocco
Zodarion murphyorum Bosmans, 1994 – Spain
Zodarion musarum Brignoli, 1984 – Greece
Zodarion nesiotes Denis, 1965 – Canary Is.
Zodarion nesiotoides Wunderlich, 1992 – Canary Is.
Zodarion nigriceps (Simon, 1873) – Corsica, Sardinia
Zodarion nigrifemur Caporiacco, 1948 – Greece
Zodarion nitidum (Audouin, 1826) (type species) – North Africa, Middle East
Zodarion noordami Bosmans, 2009 – Greece
Zodarion odem Levy, 2007 – Israel
Zodarion ogeri Bosmans & Benhalima, 2020 – Morocco
Zodarion ohridense Wunderlich, 1973 – Bulgaria, North Macedonia, Croatia, Greece, Czechia
Zodarion ovatum B. S. Zhang & F. Zhang, 2019 – Italy
Zodarion ozkutuki Coşar & Danışman, 2021 – Turkey
Zodarion pacificum Bosmans, 2009 – Croatia, Bosnia
Zodarion pallidum Denis, 1952 – Morocco
Zodarion pantaleonii Bosmans & Pantini, 2019 – Italy (Sardinia)
Zodarion parashi Wunderlich, 2022 – Greece
Zodarion petrobium Dunin & Zacharjan, 1991 – Azerbaijan, Armenia
Zodarion pileolonotatum Denis, 1935 – Libya
Zodarion pirini Drensky, 1921 – Bulgaria, Greece
Zodarion planum B. S. Zhang & F. Zhang, 2019 – China
Zodarion pseudoelegans Denis, 1934 – Spain, France, Ibiza
Zodarion pseudonigriceps Bosmans & Pantini, 2019 – Italy (Sardinia)
Zodarion pusio Simon, 1914 – France, Italy, Tunisia, Croatia, Bosnia-Hercegovina, Slovenia
Zodarion pythium Denis, 1935 – Greece
Zodarion remotum Denis, 1935 – Corsica, Italy
Zodarion reticulatum Kulczyński, 1908 – Cyprus
Zodarion robertbosmans Wunderlich, 2017 – Turkey
Zodarion rubidum Simon, 1914 – Europe (introduced in USA, Canada)
Zodarion rudyi Bosmans, 1994 – Portugal, Spain
Zodarion ruffoi Caporiacco, 1951 – France, Italy, Turkey
Zodarion samos Bosmans, 2009 – Greece
Zodarion santorini Bosmans, 2009 – Greece
Zodarion sardum Bosmans, 1997 – Sardinia
Zodarion scutatum Wunderlich, 1980 – Slovenia, Croatia
Zodarion segurense Bosmans, 1994 – Spain
Zodarion sharurensis (Zamani & Marusik, 2022) – Azerbaijan
Zodarion siirtensis Coşar, 2021 – Turkey
Zodarion simplex Jocqué, 2011 – United Arab Emirates
Zodarion soror (Simon, 1873) – Corsica
Zodarion spinibarbe Wunderlich, 1973 – Crete
Zodarion styliferum (Simon, 1870) – Portugal, Spain, Madeira
Zodarion styliferum extraneum (Denis, 1935) – Portugal
Zodarion sungar (Jocqué, 1991) – Turkey, Iraq
Zodarion talyschicum Dunin & Nenilin, 1987 – Azerbaijan, Iran
Zodarion thoni Nosek, 1905 – Eastern Europe to Azerbaijan
Zodarion timidum (Simon, 1874) – Spain, France
Zodarion trianguliferum Denis, 1952 – Morocco
Zodarion tuber (Wunderlich, 2022) – Portugal
Zodarion tunetiacum Strand, 1906 – Tunisia
Zodarion turcicum Wunderlich, 1980 – Bulgaria, Greece, Turkey
Zodarion turkesi Coşar & Danışman, 2021 – Turkey
Zodarion valentii Bosmans, Loverre & Addante, 2019 – Morocco, Algeria, Spain, Italy
Zodarion van Bosmans, 2009 – Turkey
Zodarion vanimpei Bosmans, 1994 – Spain
Zodarion vankeerorum Bosmans, 2009 – Greece
Zodarion varoli Akpınar, 2016 – Turkey
Zodarion vicinum Denis, 1935 – England, Italy
Zodarion viduum Denis, 1937 – Portugal
Zodarion walsinghami Denis, 1937 – Algeria
Zodarion weissi (Deltshev & Naumova, 2022) – Bulgaria
Zodarion wesolowskae Bosmans & Benhalima, 2020 – Morocco
Zodarion yagmuri Coşar & Danışman, 2021 – Turkey
Zodarion yemenensis Jocqué & van Harten, 2015 – Yemen
Zodarion zorba Bosmans, 2009 – Greece

References

 
Araneomorphae genera
Spiders of Asia
Spiders of Africa